100 Ton Chicken is the third studio album by the blues band, Chicken Shack, released in 1969. This album was Paul Raymond's first album as a member of Chicken Shack, replacing Christine Perfect.

Unlike its predecessors, 40 Blue Fingers, Freshly Packed and Ready to Serve and O.K. Ken?, 100 Ton Chicken did not reach the UK Albums Chart. AllMusic noted "Sorry, but this chicken laid a 20-ton rotten egg".

The entire album and the rest of the Chicken Shack sessions on Blue Horizon were made available on the CD compilation Chicken Shack - The Complete Blue Horizon Sessions (2007). Several outtakes from the 100 Ton Chicken sessions were made available for the first time on this compilation. "Smartest Girl in the World" and "Hideaway" were both unpublished outtakes. "The Things You Put Me Through" was also an outtake but it had been released as the B side to the single "Tears in the Wind".

Track listing
All songs written and composed by Stan Webb, except where noted.

Personnel

Chicken Shack
Stan Webb – guitar, vocals
Paul Raymond – keyboards, vocals
Andy Sylvester – bass guitar
Dave Bidwell – drums, congas, cowbell

Additional personnel
Mike Vernon – finger cymbals

Production
Producer – Mike Vernon
Engineer – Mike Ross
Studio – CBS
Photography and design – Terence Ibbott

References

1969 albums
Chicken Shack albums
Blue Horizon Records albums
Albums produced by Mike Vernon (record producer)